Čašić Dolac is a  small village on the Rogozna mountain in the municipality of Novi Pazar, Serbia.

External links
Map of Čašić Dolac location

Populated places in Raška District
Novi Pazar